The men's 110 metres hurdles event at the 2009 European Athletics U23 Championships was held in Kaunas, Lithuania, at S. Dariaus ir S. Girėno stadionas (Darius and Girėnas Stadium) on 17 and 18 July.

Medalists

Results

Final
18 July
Wind: -0.7 m/s

Heats
17 July
Qualified: first 2 each heat and 2 best to final

Heat 1
Wind: 0.0 m/s

Heat 2
Wind: -0.4 m/s

Heat 3
Wind: 0.9 m/s

Participation
According to an unofficial count, 23 athletes from 15 countries participated in the event.

 (1)
 (1)
 (3)
 (2)
 (1)
 (2)
 (1)
 (1)
 (1)
 (3)
 (2)
 (1)
 (1)
 (1)
 (2)

References

110 metres hurdles
Sprint hurdles at the European Athletics U23 Championships